David Edward Keefe (born 23 June 1957) is an English former professional footballer who played in the Football League as a winger for Southend United and Torquay United. He was born in Dagenham.

Keefe began his football career as an apprentice with Southend United, making his league debut prior to turning professional in July 1975. He made only six appearances, scoring once, before leaving to join Torquay United in August 1977. He played only twice for Mike Green's side, draws at home to AFC Bournemouth and Darlington but couldn't establish himself in the first team, particularly with the presence of Dave Tomlin in the Torquay squad before leaving league football, joining non-league Ilford and later playing for Epping Town.
he went on to have two sons  named Glen Keefe and Sean Keefe who themselves went on to play football for numerous football clubs and earned many trophies and awards both playing for the Burnham Ramblers football club.

References

1957 births
Living people
Footballers from Dagenham
English footballers
Association football wingers
Southend United F.C. players
Torquay United F.C. players
Ilford F.C. players
English Football League players
Epping Town F.C. players